Alexander "Alex P" Papaconstantinou (Greek: Αλέξανδρος "Άλεξ" Παπακωνσταντίνου; born 29 December 1979 in Brännkyrka, Sweden) is a Greek-Swedish songwriter and music producer. He has worked with a number of artists including Jennifer López, Paulina Rubio, Enrique Iglesias, Antique, Helena Paparizou, Arash, Anna Vissi, Cameron Cartio, Eleni Foureira, Sarbel and Tamta. In 2011, Papaconstantinou adopted the production pseudonym Alex P and started collaborating with record producer RedOne, joined RedOne's production and 2101 songs writing team. His collaboration continued until 2014. Along with Adam Baptiste, Papaconstantinou has also been credited as a featured artist under the name "The WAV.s". Since 2017, he has been a member of the pop band VAX. Papaconstantinou has also written and co-written a number of notable songs for Eurovision Song Contest for Sarbel (Greece), Aysel and Arash (Azerbaijan), Ivi Adamou, Eleni Foureira, Tamta and Andromache (Cyprus).

Eurovision
Papaconstantinou has written and co-written a number of songs in various Eurovision Song Contests:

Collaboration with RedOne
In 2011, Papaconstantinou adopted the production pseudonym Alex P and started collaborating with record producer RedOne, joined RedOne's production and 2101 songs writing team. This collaboration lasted three years until 2014, during which time he co-wrote and co-produced the Enrique Iglesias hit song "I Like How It Feels" and co-wrote and co-produced the Khaled album C'est la vie. In 2013, singer Marc Anthony covered the Khaled song "C'est la vie" as a salsa tune titled "Vivir Mi Vida" ("Live My Life") for his studio album 3.0. This version won a Latin Grammy Award in 2013 for Record of the Year and holds the record for the second-longest run inside the top-five in the Billboard Latin Songs, with 51 weeks. During his collaboration with RedOne, Alex P co-wrote or produced multiple hit singles leading to 3 BMI Awards and a Latin Grammy Award.

VAX

In 2017, Papaconstantinou co-founded and became a member of the music trio VAX, along with singer Teddy Sky and guitarist Viktor Svensson. VAX released the song "6 in the Morning" featuring the Polish singer-songwriter Margaret followed  by "Fireproof" featuring band lead singer Teddy Sky.

Discography

Singles

Personal life
Alexander Papaconstantinou is of Greek descent. His sister is SVT presenter Ritza Papaconstantinou.

Selected production discography

References

External links
Alex Papaconstantinou charting songs on Swedish Singles Charts

1979 births
Living people
Musicians from Stockholm
People from Södermanland
Swedish people of Greek descent
Swedish record producers
Swedish songwriters